The President of the George Washington University is the chief executive officer of the George Washington University, appointed by the GW Board of Trustees and charged  "to establish the University's vision, oversee its teaching and research mission and guide its future." 

The current president of The George Washington University is Mark S. Wrighton. In September 2021, University officials announced Wrighton would succeed incumbent Thomas LeBlanc in an interim capacity, until a permanent replacement could be found. Wrighton took office on 1 January 2022.

In January 2023, the University announced that Ellen Granberg had been selected to succeed Wrighton. Granberg, who will become the first woman to serve as president of George Washington University, will take office on 1 July 2023.

List

References

External links
Presidents of the University, GW Libraries

George Washington University people